Brownman Revival is a Filipino reggae band founded in November 1994. They count Bob Marley, Big Mountain, Aswad, Inner Circle, and UB40 among their musical influences as well as Filipino reggae group Tropical Depression and OPM acts such as Eraserheads, APO Hiking Society, and VST & Company.  One author describes Brownman Revival's music as "reggae-inspired beats with traditional folk pop rhythms and the basest of lyrical themes".

Members
Dennis Concepcion – drums, vocals
Januarie Sundiang – percussion, vocals
Nhoel Dizon Austria – guitars, vocals
Randy "Ranz" Mercader – keyboards, vocals
Benjamin "Benjah" Perez – lead vocals
Dawn Cepeda – bass
Ian Sumagui – alto saxophone
PJ Aguilar – tenor saxophone
Pawlo Mendoza – trumpet

Former members
Dino Concepcion – lead vocals
Alphy Desaville – lead guitar, vocals 
Alexander "Ambet" Abundo – trumpet
Andrew Santos – saxophone
Jojo Antinero – saxophone
Jao Larion – bass
Hiroki Ambo – bass
Jayson Cuevas – trombone
Onard Bonavente – keyboards, vocals

Discography

Studio albums and EPs

Compilation albums
 Ultraelectromagnetic Jam – "Maling Akala" (Sony BMG Music Philippines, 2005)

Awards and nominations

References 

Musical groups established in 1994
Musical groups from Metro Manila
Filipino reggae musical groups
Filipino rock music groups
1994 establishments in the Philippines